Kariyala is a village in the Chakwal District in Punjab, Pakistan.

It is situated about 10 km south of main Chakwal city, off the road leading to Choa Saidan Shah. It is located on a rainwater ravine called Banvaee and between the salt range and Karangli mountain; the antimony obtained from Karangal mountain is famous all over from old times.

The village was founded by a Punjabi Hindu, Baba Paraga Das, who belonged to the Chhibber clan of Mohyal Brahmins.

Kariyala served as the focal point for the Chhibbers, a clan of the Mohyal Brahmin caste in the Punjab region. It is the habitat of big landlords like the late Chaudhry Ghulam Haider. Before the Partition of India in 1947, it was a medium town consisting of Muslims, largely of the Kahut caste, as well as Hindus. Hindus were in comparatively considerable ratio but during the partition, they migrated to the newly independent Dominion of India. A Hindu landlord, Jaggat Singh Chhibber, and his family continued to live in Kariyala and his son, Ravinder Kumar Chhibber, the new head of the Chhibber family after his father's death, enjoy the occupation of his estate. Kariyala has a minority of other castes, such as the Gondals, though Kahuts outnumber them numerically.

References 

Populated places in Chakwal District